The 72nd Grand Prix Automobile de Pau (Pau Grand Prix) was held around as held around the streets of the city of Pau, Pyrénées-Atlantiques, south-western France, on 19 May 2013.

Luca Ghiotto won the race, starting from sixth position.

Entry list
All drivers used the Tatuus-Renault machine running the Eurocup Formula Renault 2.0 that season.

Race Results

Qualifying

Notes:
 – Matthieu Vaxivière and Marc Cattaneo's best laps time were deleted.

Qualification Race

Race

References

Pau Grand Prix
Pau Grand Prix
Pau Grand Prix